The 1916 United States Senate election in Washington was held on November 7, 1916. Incumbent Republican Miles Poindexter was for a second term in office over Democratic former Senator George Turner and Socialist Bruce Rogers.

Primary elections were held on September 12. Poindexter overcame a strong primary challenge from U.S. Representative William E. Humphrey and college president Enoch Albert Bryan.

Republican primary

Candidates
Mrs. John B. Allen, widow of the late Senator John B. Allen
Enoch Albert Bryan, president of Washington State College
Schuyler Duryee
William E. Humphrey, U.S. Representative from Seattle
Miles Poindexter, incumbent U.S. Senator since 1911
William Alvin Spalding

Results

Democratic primary

Candidates 
Robert Bridges, Commissioner of the Port of Seattle
George Turner, former U.S. Senator (1897–1903)

Results

Progressive primary

Candidates 
Walter J. Thompson

Results 
Thompson was unopposed for the Progressive nomination.

General election

Results

See also 
 1916 United States Senate elections

References

1916
Washington
United States Senate